Brian Francis Peake OAM (born 4 December 1953) is a former Australian rules footballer who played for  and  in the West Australian Football League (WAFL), and  in the Victorian Football League (VFL). He also played State of Origin football for Western Australia from 1978 to 1987, captaining the side in 1979, 1980, 1986 and 1987. Peake was awarded the Medal of the Order of Australia in 1990 and was inducted into the West Australian Football Hall of Fame in 2004, and into the Australian Football Hall of Fame in 2013.

WAFL career
The son of Laurie Peake, who  played 89 games for East Fremantle, Peake was a versatile ruck-rover, half-forward flanker or centreman. He had a long and successful career with East Fremantle where he made his debut in 1972, playing in three premiership winning sides (1974, 1979 and 1985), winning a Sandover Medal in 1977 and captaining the All-Australian side in 1979 and 1986. 

Peake played 296 premiership games for the Blue and Whites, and holds the record for six club Best and Fairests; after being controversially sacked with full support of the board by the Sharks three rounds into 1990, he moved on to Perth when no other WASFL club was interested in him. In his short career with the Demons, Peake played his 300th WAFL career premiership match before retiring after 372 career premiership matches in elite Australian rules football.

Peake has been named a WAFL Hall of Fame Legend.

VFL career
Peake transferred to Victorian Football League club Geelong midseason in 1981. Amidst much hype he was flown to Kardinia Park by helicopter for training where a crowd of 3000 fans awaited his arrival.  In 1982 he was promoted to team captain after just 13 VFL games, although he gave up this position a year later to club game record holder Ian Nankervis. Widely regarded as one of the most in-form players in the country at the time, Peake was paid $1,000 a game (high by 1980s standards). After the 1984 season, Peake returned to Western Australia, where he continued to play for a further six seasons.

Other matches
Peake also played nine pre-season/night series matches for East Fremantle and 22 interstate matches for Western Australia, along with a pre-season/night series match for Geelong (these are recognised as senior by the WAFL but not by the VFL/AFL).

If these matches are included, then Peake played a total of 404 senior career games, becoming the second West Australian behind Barry Cable to reach 400 senior career games, and equalling Cable's record for most career senior games played by any elite Australian rules football player born in Western Australia.

The VFL/AFL list Cable and Peake's total as 403, excluding their VFL/AFL pre-season/night series match (Cable for North Melbourne and Peake for Geelong).

Notes

References

External links

Brian Peake player profile page at WAFL FootyFacts

1953 births
Living people
All-Australians (1953–1988)
East Fremantle Football Club players
Geelong Football Club captains
Geelong Football Club players
Australian rules footballers from Perth, Western Australia
Perth Football Club players
Sandover Medal winners
West Australian Football Hall of Fame inductees
Western Australian State of Origin players
Recipients of the Medal of the Order of Australia
Australian Football Hall of Fame inductees
Australian people of Māori descent